Jan Łostowski (13 January 1951 – 12 November 2009) was a Polish weightlifter. He competed in the men's featherweight event at the 1976 Summer Olympics.

References

1951 births
2009 deaths
Polish male weightlifters
Olympic weightlifters of Poland
Weightlifters at the 1976 Summer Olympics
Sportspeople from Wrocław